Budapuranam was a grammar book in Tamil language followed by while second Sangam period.

References

Tamil language
Tamil-language literature
Ancient Tamil Nadu